Meta-information may refer to:
Metadata
Knowledge tagging